Marracuene, earlier known as Vila Luísa, is a town in Mozambique's Maputo Province in Marracuene District, located 30 km north of Maputo on the Incomati River.  The Parque de Campismo de Marracuene, a popular camping destination, is located nearby.

History
On February 2, 1895, Marracuene was the site of a decisive battle between Portuguese forces under major Caldas Xavier and Gaza forces of emperor Gungunyane. The Portuguese were able to defeat the larger Gaza forces by means of repeating rifles and a machine gun.

Tourism
Marracuene served as a popular tourist destination in Mozambique's colonial era thanks to a 21-mile beach on the Indian Ocean; the town also served as a key link in the Lourenço Marques Railway System.

References
Hance, William A. and Irene S. Van Dongen.  "Lourenço Marques in Delagoa Bay."  Economic Geography 33.3 (1957): 238–256.
Wheeler, Douglas L. "Gungunyane the Negotiator: A Study in African Diplomacy."  The Journal of African History 9.4 (1968): 585–602.

External links
Kruger Park site on Marracuene

Populated places in Maputo Province
Marracuene
Conflicts in 1895